Hendrick Sharp (1815 – July 1892) was a Union Navy sailor in the American Civil War and a recipient of the U.S. military's highest decoration, the Medal of Honor, for his actions at the Battle of Mobile Bay.

Military service
Born in 1815 in Spain, Sharp immigrated to the United States and was living in New York when he joined the U.S. Navy. During the Battle of Mobile Bay on August 5, 1864, he "fought his gun with skill and courage" despite heavy fire. For this action, he was awarded the Medal of Honor four months later, on December 31, 1864.

Medal of Honor citation
Rank and organization: Seaman, U.S. Navy. Accredited to: New York. G.O. No.: 45, 31 December 1864.

Sharp's official Medal of Honor citation reads:
As captain of a 100-pounder rifle gun on topgallant forecastle on board the U.S.S. Richmond during action against rebel forts and gunboats and with the ram Tennessee in Mobile Bay, 5 August 1864. Despite damage to his ship and the loss of several men on board as enemy fire raked her decks, Sharp fought his gun with skill and courage throughout a furious 2-hour battle which resulted in the surrender of the rebel ram Tennessee and in the damaging and destruction of the batteries at Fort Morgan.

Death and burial
Medal of Honor recipient Hendrick Sharp died in late July 1892 aboard the receiving ship  at the Norfolk Naval Shipyard, Portsmouth, Virginia. He was buried at Captain Ted Conaway Memorial Naval Cemetery in Portsmouth, Virginia. His status as a Medal of Honor recipient was not discovered until late 2009. A new grave marker indicating his decoration was unveiled in 2010.

References

External links 
 

1815 births
1892 deaths
Spanish emigrants to the United States
People of New York (state) in the American Civil War
Union Navy sailors
United States Navy Medal of Honor recipients
Foreign-born Medal of Honor recipients
American Civil War recipients of the Medal of Honor